Khoshkeh Rud (also Romanized as Khoshkeh Rūd; also known as Khoshgeh Rūd and Khoshk Rūd) is a village in Sardabeh Rural District, in the Central District of Ardabil County, Ardabil Province, Iran. At the 2006 census, its population was 840, in 160 families.

References 

Towns and villages in Ardabil County